Maruim is a municipality located in the Brazilian state of Sergipe. Maruim has a population density of 180 inhabitants per square kilometer. Maruim borders the municipalities of Laranjeiras, Rosário do Catete, and Santo Amaro das Brotas, all within the state of Sergipe.

The Sergipe River makes up the southern border of Marium, and the Ganhamoroba River, a major tributary of the Sergipe, crosses in a north-south direction through the municipality.

Etymology

The name of the municipality of Maruim comes from the Tupi–Guarani term mberu'i, meaning a small fly or mosquito.

History

The first Portuguese colonial settlement in the area was near the Sergipe River and was called Mombaça. The settlement served as an important point of transfer of sugar cane from the interior of Sergipe to Bahia, Pernambuco, and Rio de Janeiro. Mombaça was abandoned due to mosquito-born diseases to relocated to its current location on higher ground on the sugar plantation of Engenho Maruim de Baixo. The village was founded on February 19, 1835 as Santo Amaro do Maroim and elevated to city stats on May 5, 1854. Steamboat service was established between Aracaju, Maruim and Laranjeiras in 1855, further boosting commerce in the region.

References

Municipalities in Sergipe
Populated places established in 1854
1854 establishments in Brazil